Iku or IKU may refer to:

Languages
 Iku language (ISO 639: ikv), a Plateau language of Nigeria
 Arhuaco language (ISO 639: arh), also known as Ikʉ, a Chibchan language of Colombia
 Inuktitut (ISO 639: iku), an Inuit language of Canada

Other uses
 I.K.U., a 2001 Japanese erotic cyberpunk film
 Iku (singer), a Japanese singer
 Istanbul Kültür University (İKÜ), in Istanbul, Turkey
 Irène K:son Ullberg (born 1930), Swedish painter
 Issyk-Kul International Airport, Kyrgyzstan (IATA: IKU)